Jawaharlal Nehru Stadium (formerly Khajamalai Stadium) is an stadium located in Tiruchirappalli, Tamil Nadu. It's the principal venue for the sport of Cricket in the city. Located in the BHEL township, it has hosted three first-class matches since 1968–69. The last match played at this ground was the KS Subbiah Pillai Trophy between Tamil Nadu and Hyderabad during the 1989–90 season.

References

External links
 Profile at ESPNcricinfo
 Profile at CricketArchive

Cricket grounds in Tamil Nadu
Sports venues in Tiruchirappalli
Defunct cricket grounds in India
Sports venues completed in 1968
1968 establishments in Madras State
20th-century architecture in India